The Monchino or Monchinu (Cantabrian: [mon'ʧinu]) is a breed of horse indigenous to the Valle de Guriezo in the Cantabria region of northern Spain, and also extending into neighbouring Biscay province. It is listed in the Official Catalogue of Livestock Breeds of Spain (Catálogo Oficial de Razas de Ganado de España) in the group of autochthonous breeds in danger of extinction.
The word monchinu means highlander, from the mountains, in Cantabrian.

See also
Iberian horse

References

Horse breeds
Horse breeds originating in Spain
Animal breeds originating in Cantabria